Bits and Pieces is the fifth compilation of material from comedy duo Scared Weird Little Guys. The album was released in May 2004.

At the ARIA Music Awards of 2004 the album won the ARIA Award for Best Comedy Release.

Track listing
 "Cleanin' Out My Tuckerbag" – 2:19
 "South Australia" – 2:43
 "Am I Ever Going To See Your Face Again? (In the Style of Advance Australia Fair)" – 0:44
 "Loved You Better" – 2:40
 "Staying Alive (As Sung By a Welsh Male Voice Choir) " – 1:04
 "Your Face" – 3:00
 "Rock n Roll All Night (As Sung By a Barbershop Quartet)" – 0:51
 "Born in the USA (In The Style Of Austrian Tyroler Music)" – 0:27
 "Morse Code Song" – 0:59
 "Whistle Pops" – 3:23
 "Queensland" – 2:38
 "Our Cathy" – 2:01
 "Governer General" – 2:28
 "Still Can't Find Saddam" – 2:10
 "Waugh Song" – 2:10
 "Wimbledon" – 2:01
 "World Leaders" – 1:56
 "Sex and Drugs and Leg Spin Bowl" – 2:14
 "Australian of he Year" – 2:32
 "Underwear Song" – 2:24
 "Springtime's Here Again (2003)" – 3:36
 "Seven Topics In One Song" – 3:47
 "Cleanin' Out My Tuckerbag (Radio Friendly Version)" – 2:19

References 

2004 albums
ARIA Award-winning albums